Nina Yevgenyevna Menshikova (8 August 1928 – 26 December 2007) was a Soviet actress.

She was the wife of Stanislav Rostotsky and the mother of Andrei Rostotsky. Nina Menshikova was awarded the title of People's Artist of the RSFSR in 1977 and also have received USSR State Prize in 1970 for her performance in We'll Live Till Monday.  Her other awards included the Medal "For Valiant Labour in the Great Patriotic War 1941-1945", the Medal "Veteran of Labour" and the Jubilee Medal "50 Years of Victory in the Great Patriotic War 1941-1945".

Selected filmography
 Early Joys (Первые радости, 1956) as Ksana Ragozina
 Ballad of a Soldier (Баллада о солдате, 1959) as telegraph operator
 The Girls (Девчата, 1961) as Vera 
 A Mother's Heart (Сердце матери, 1965) as Anna 
 A Mother's Devotion (Верность матери, 1966)
 We'll Live Till Monday (Доживём до понедельника, 1968) as Svetlana Mikhailovna 
 One Hundred Days After Childhood (Сто дней после детства, 1974) as Ksenia Lvovna
 School Waltz (Школьный вальс, 1978) as Dina's mother 
 Visit to Minotaur (Визит к Минотавру, 1987) as Anna Yablonskaya

References

External links 

1928 births
2007 deaths
People's Artists of the RSFSR
Soviet film actresses
Recipients of the USSR State Prize
Gerasimov Institute of Cinematography alumni
Soviet voice actresses
Russian voice actresses
Burials at Vagankovo Cemetery
Honored Artists of the RSFSR
Actresses from Moscow
20th-century Russian women